Gateway Center Arena at College Park is a  multi-purpose arena in College Park, Georgia. It is the home venue of the College Park Skyhawks of the NBA G League and the Atlanta Dream of the Women's National Basketball Association. 

The arena's first public event was an open house on November 9, 2019, while the Skyhawks' first game at the arena took place on November 21.

Location and design
The 5,000 seat arena is mainly used for basketball; however, there are plans for the facility to also host concerts and other events. It is located adjacent to the Georgia International Convention Center.

References

External links
 Official Site
College Park Skyhawks 
Atlanta Dream 

Basketball venues in Georgia (U.S. state)
Music venues in Georgia (U.S. state)
Sports venues in Atlanta
Sports venues in Georgia (U.S. state)
College Park Skyhawks
Buildings and structures in Fulton County, Georgia
2019 establishments in Georgia (U.S. state)
Sports venues completed in 2019
NBA G League venues
Erie BayHawks (2017–2019)